In Greek mythology, Deianira (/ˌdeɪ.əˈnaɪrə/; Ancient Greek: Δηϊάνειρα, Dēiáneira, or Δῃάνειρα, Dēáneira, [dɛːiáneːra]) was the name of three individuals whose name meant as "man-destroyer" or "destroyer of her husband".

 Deianira, daughter of Lycaon, son of the giant Aezeius, one of the first kings of the Peloponnesus. She married Pelasgus, son of Niobe and Zeus and, according to some, she became by him mother of the impious Lycaon.
Deianira, daughter of Oeneus of Calydon and wife of Heracles.
 Deianira, an Amazon killed by Heracles during his quest for the girdle of Hippolyta.

Notes

References 

 Antoninus Liberalis, The Metamorphoses of Antoninus Liberalis translated by Francis Celoria (Routledge 1992). Online version at the Topos Text Project.
 Diodorus Siculus, The Library of History translated by Charles Henry Oldfather. Twelve volumes. Loeb Classical Library. Cambridge, Massachusetts: Harvard University Press; London: William Heinemann, Ltd. 1989. Vol. 3. Books 4.59–8. Online version at Bill Thayer's Web Site
 Diodorus Siculus, Bibliotheca Historica. Vol 1-2. Immanel Bekker. Ludwig Dindorf. Friedrich Vogel. in aedibus B. G. Teubneri. Leipzig. 1888-1890. Greek text available at the Perseus Digital Library.
 Dionysus of Halicarnassus, Roman Antiquities. English translation by Earnest Cary in the Loeb Classical Library, 7 volumes. Harvard University Press, 1937-1950. Online version at Bill Thayer's Web Site
 Dionysius of Halicarnassus, Antiquitatum Romanarum quae supersunt, Vol I-IV. . Karl Jacoby. In Aedibus B.G. Teubneri. Leipzig. 1885. Greek text available at the Perseus Digital Library.
 Hesiod, Catalogue of Women from Homeric Hymns, Epic Cycle, Homerica translated by Evelyn-White, H G. Loeb Classical Library Volume 57. London: William Heinemann, 1914. Online version at theio.com

Amazons (Greek mythology)